Ergosterol biosynthetic protein 28 is a protein that in humans is encoded by the ERG28 gene.

References

External links

Further reading